Henry Kessler may refer to:

 Henry Kessler (baseball) (1847–1900), a 19th-century major-league baseball player
 Henry Kessler (soccer) (born 1998), an American professional soccer player
 Henry H. Kessler (1896–1978), an American surgeon